The Frankland River is a river in the Great Southern region of Western Australia. The Frankland River is the largest river by volume in the region and the eighth largest in the state. The traditional owners of the area are the Noongar people, who know the river as Kwakoorillup.

Location and features
Mt Frankland was given its modern name in December 1829 by naval ship's surgeon Thomas Braidwood Wilson after the Surveyor General of Van Diemen's Land George Frankland. Wilson explored the area in company with the Noongar Mokare from King George Sound, John Kent (officer in charge of the Commissariat at Frederick Town, King George Sound), two convicts and Private William Gough of the 39th Regiment, while his ship the Governor Phillip was being repaired at King George Sound. The river was sighted by Captain Thomas Bannister in January 1831, and was named by Governor James Stirling when Bannister reported its existence to him. Stirling's choice was influenced by Wilson's naming of Mt Frankland. The Frankland was apparently previously known by sealers as the Deep River.

The Gordon River, a tributary of the Frankland River, has its source south-west of the town of Broomehill. The other two smaller tributaries are Towerlup Brook and Ornabullup Creek. The Walpole, the Deep and the Frankland all flow into the Nornalup Inlet west of Walpole.

85% of the Frankland River's catchment, mostly about the  rainfall isohyet, is cleared for agriculture. The main land uses are cereal cropping and sheep grazing, with minor dairy farming, agroforestry, viticulture and olive farming.

Salinity has increased in the river system with average values of 2 parts per thousand in the 1970s to 1980s to 30 ppt since 2000.

See also

References

Rivers of the Great Southern region
Warren bioregion